The Oakleigh Plate is a Melbourne Racing Club Group 1 Thoroughbred open handicap horse race, run over a distance of 1100 metres at Caulfield Racecourse, Melbourne, Australia in late February. Total prize money is A$750,000.

History
The Oakleigh Plate forms the middle leg of the autumn sprinting series over the Melbourne Autumn Carnival, preceded by the G1 Lightning Stakes run over 1000m, WFA, Flemington, on the last Saturday in January, and followed by the Newmarket Handicap, run over 1200m at Flemington in the first week of March.

1949 racebook

Distance
 1884–1972 – 5 furlongs (~1100 metres)
 1973–1995 – 1100 metres
 1996 – 1150 metres
 1997 onwards – 1100 metres

Venue
During World War II the event was held at Flemington Racecourse.
In 1996 the event was held at Sandown Racecourse due to reconstruction of Caulfield Racecourse.
In 2023 the race was run at Sandown Racecourse.

Winners

 2023 – Uncommon James 
 2022 – Marabi 
 2021 – †Celebrity Queen / Portland Sky 
 2020 – Pippie 
 2019 – Booker 
 2018 – Russian Revolution 
 2017 – Sheidel 
 2016 – Flamberge 
 2015 – Shamal Wind 
 2014 – Lankan Rupee
 2013 – Mrs Onassis
 2012 – Woorim
 2011 – Eagle Falls
 2010 – Starspangledbanner
 2009 – Swiss Ace
 2008 – Weekend Hussler
 2007 – Undue
 2006 – Snitzel
 2005 – Fastnet Rock
 2004 – Reactive
 2003 – River Dove
 2002 – Sudurka
 2001 – Miss Kournikova
 2000 – Sports
 1999 – Dantelah
 1998 – Singing The Blues
 1997 – Spartacus
 1996 – Drum
 1995 – Khaptingly
 1994 – Kenvain
 1993 – Mookta
 1992 – Schillaci
 1991 – With Me
 1990 – Scarlet Bisque
 1989 – Clay Hero
 1988 – Snippets
 1987 – Placid Ark
 1986 – Coal Pak
 1985 – Mr. Illusion
 1984 – Mighty Avalanche
 1983 – Sans Rival
 1982 – Harpagus
 1981 – Gleaming Waters
 1980 – Turf Ruler
 1979 – Mistress Anne
 1978 – Hartbalm
 1977 – Merger
 1976 – Kentland
 1975 – Zephyr Bay
 1974 – Tontonan
 1973 – Zambari
 1972 – Dual Choice
 1971 – Dual Choice
 1970 – Alrello
 1969 – Iga Ninja
 1968 – Magic Ruler
 1967 – Marmion   
 1966 – Citius
 1965 – Time And Tide
 1964 – Pardon Me
 1963 – Kilshery
 1962 – New Statesman
 1961 – Gay Saba
 1960 – Power Duke
 1959 – Gold Stakes
 1958 – Dubbo
 1957 – Adelina
 1956 – Lucky Stride
 1955 – Dicast
 1954 – Birdwood
 1953 – Winlake
 1952 – Cromwell
 1951 – Regal Scout
 1950 – Spitfire
 1949 – San Domenico
 1948 – Tahmoor
 1947 – Kind Link
 1946 – Delina
 1945 – Ava
 1944 – Burberry
 1943 – Millais
 1942 – High Title
 1941 – Zonda
 1940 – Unishak
 1939 – Aurie's Star
 1938 – Pamelus
 1937 – Aurie's Star
 1936 – Belle Silhouette
 1935 – Arachne
 1934 – First Money
 1933 – Ibrani
 1932 – †Blematic / Umbertana 
 1931 – †Merab / First Arrow 
 1930 – Figure
 1929 – Day Dreamer
 1928 – Euston
 1927 – Baringhup
 1926 – Perspective   
 1925 – Adrift
 1924 – Royal Thought
 1923 – Chelidon
 1922 – Wish Wynne
 1921 – ‡race not held
 1920 – Molly's Robe
 1919 – Cielo
 1918 – Poitrina
 1917 – Woorak
 1916 – Tullia
 1915 – Brattle
 1914 – Popinjay
 1913 – Burri
 1912 – Queen Of Scots
 1911 – Blairgour
 1910 – Celerity
 1909 – Irishman
 1908 – Bright Steel
 1907 – Beresina
 1906 – Wandin
 1905 – Abington
 1904 – Silenus
 1903 – F.J.A
 1902 – Drawbridge
 1901 – Wakeful
 1900 – Veneda
 1899 – Stand Off
 1898 – Resolute
 1897 – So And So
 1896 – Coil
 1895 – Wakawatea
 1894 – Moorite
 1893 – Lord Hopetoun
 1892 – Camoola
 1891 – Wild Rose
 1890 – Titan
 1889 – Nectarine
 1888 – My Lord
 1887 – Surprise
 1886 – William Tell
 1885 – Marie Louise
 1884 – Malua

† Dead heat
‡ An embargo on Melbourne racing was in force by the Victorian Cabinet

See also
 List of Australian Group races
 Group races

References

Open sprint category horse races
Group 1 stakes races in Australia
Caulfield Racecourse